The 2022 Porsche Carrera Cup North America is the second season of the Porsche Carrera Cup North America. It is scheduled to begin on March 16 at Sebring International Raceway and end on October 1 at Road Atlanta.

Calendar
The preliminary calendar was released on August 6, 2021, at IMSA's annual State of the Sport Address, without disclosing the location of round 2. On October 19, 2021, IMSA announced that an event at the Grand Prix of Long Beach would fill the vacancy in the schedule. In April 2022, Indianapolis was announced as the replacement for round seven, which was initially scheduled to be held at Canadian Tire Motorsport Park.

Series News
The previous generation 991-spec Porsche 911 GT3 Cup car would no longer be permitted to compete in 2022, meaning the grid would be entirely made up of 992-spec machinery.

Entry list

Results

Championship standings

Points system
Championship points are awarded in each class at the finish of each event. Points are awarded based on finishing positions in the race as shown in the chart below.

Driver's Championship

†: Post-event penalty. Car moved to back of class.

References

External links
Official website

Porsche Carrera Cup North America
Porsche Carrera Cup North America
Porsche Carrera Cup North America
|}